Gadim Minare carpets — Azerbaijani carpets belonging to the Guba carpet-weaving school.

Classification 
It is mainly produced in the city of Guba. Some carpet weavers simply call it "Darayi" or "Salyan khilasi".

Artistic features 
The composition of the central part of the carpet differs sharply from other Azerbaijani carpets. In the center, a comb-like chain oriented from left and right to the center creates new quadrilaterals, which in turn form a mesh network. In many cases, their inner parts are decorated with cross-type elements, and their outer parts are decorated with hooked lines. In these carpets, the "chain" element surrounding the central area is the word "Allah" written in Kufic script. However, over time, it lost its meaning and remained just a decorative element. A triangular "Fan" element is added to the corners of the central area.

Carpet "Gadim Minare" is woven in soothing colors. The background of the central area is mostly dark blue or red. In addition, the central part should match the color of the background together with the color of the border.

Technical characteristics 
Ancient minaret carpets are among the excellent examples of Guba-Shirvan carpet weaving school. 

The size of such carpets starts from 120x400 cm. Carpets are 145,000 to 200,000 per square meter, and the height of the loops is 5-7 mm.

See also 
 Shabalyt buta carpet
 Azerbaijani rug
 Gollu-chichi carpets

References

Azerbaijani rugs and carpets